This is a bibliography of works by Theodore von Kármán.

Books

Papers

1900s

1910s

1920s

1930s

1940s

1950s

1960s

Patents

References

Lists of books
Engineering books